Nolan Thiessen (born November 6, 1980 in Pilot Mound, Manitoba) is a Canadian curler.

Career
Thiessen, in his debut at Canadian Juniors, lost the final of the 2001 Canadian Junior Curling Championships playing lead for Mike McEwen. Thiessen was a member of the 2003 Winter Universiade championship team. He represented Brandon University, playing lead for Mike McEwen. After university, he played lead for Sean Grassie before moving to play in Alberta as Mark Johnson's lead in 2004. In 2006, he moved to play for Kevin Koe. Thiessen won the 2008 Canada Cup of Curling with the team, and qualified for his first Brier in 2010 as Team Alberta. The team won the Brier after beating Ontario's Glenn Howard 6-5 in the final. They went on to win at that year's world championship, securing the gold medal after a win over Norway, skipped by Torger Nergård. After Pat Simmons signed on with the team, they went to their second Brier in 2012, but lost to Ontario, skipped by Glenn Howard in the final. At the 2014 Brier the rink repeated as Canadian champions, defeating John Morris' B.C. rink 10-5 in the final. The team would go on to finish in 4th place at the 2014 World Men's Curling Championship. After the season, Koe left the team and was replaced by John Morris. The team would represent Team Canada at the 2015 Tim Hortons Brier as defending champions. They would win the 2015 Brier and go on to win a bronze medal at the 2015 Ford World Men's Curling Championship. The team would represent Team Canada at the 2016 Tim Hortons Brier for the final time, finishing in 5th place. The team would go their separate ways after the season.

Thiessen is currently the Executive Director of Marketing for Curling Canada.

Personal life
Thiessen enjoyed playing baseball growing up. He played for the Claiborne Christian High School in Louisiana and played one year at Vernon College in Texas, which led to his participation in a regional tournament for the junior College World Series. He also played baseball at the 2001 Canada Summer Games for Team Manitoba.

After playing baseball in Texas, Thiessen returned to Manitoba and finished his education at the University of Manitoba. He currently works as a self-employed chartered accountant. He is married to Christine Sinclair (not the soccer player) and has three children In 2016, he moved with his wife to McKinney, Texas, where she found work.

References

External links
 

1980 births
Living people
Brier champions
Curlers from Manitoba
Curlers from Alberta
Sportspeople from Brandon, Manitoba
World curling champions
People from Spruce Grove
Canadian emigrants to the United States
Canadian baseball players
Canadian accountants
People from McKinney, Texas
Canadian male curlers
Universiade medalists in curling
Continental Cup of Curling participants
Universiade gold medalists for Canada
Medalists at the 2003 Winter Universiade
Canada Cup (curling) participants